Haut was a newspaper published in Luxembourg between 1981 and 1983.

Defunct newspapers published in Luxembourg
French-language newspapers published in Luxembourg
German-language newspapers published in Luxembourg
1981 in Luxembourg
1983 in Luxembourg